Wesleyan School is a private college-preparatory nondenominational Christian school located 20 miles north of Atlanta in the suburban city of Peachtree Corners, Georgia, United States. It was founded in 1963 and has existed on its current grounds since 1996. The school includes grades K–12 with a student body of 1179 for the 2019–2020 school year. The high school comprises 496 students, is a member of the Georgia High School Association, and competes in the AAA classification in Region 7. The school is named after John Wesley, the founder of Methodism, and all faculty are professed Christians from varying denominations. Students come from a variety of faith backgrounds.

History 

Wesleyan School was established in 1963 as a part of Sandy Springs United Methodist Church. The school was originally a preschool named Wesleyan Day School. For the next 24 years, the school was housed at the church and grew to include elementary school. Wesleyan Day School added its middle school in 1987.

In 1988, Barbara Adler, a former teacher and assistant head, became Head of School, and during her tenure Wesleyan became an independent, Christian, college preparatory school, offering curriculum for kindergarten through 12th grade. In 1994, Wesleyan offered its first 9th grade class.

In the fall of 1994, the corporation, Wesleyan School, Inc., was formed, and in the spring of 1995, a divestiture agreement from Sandy Springs United Methodist Church was finalized. A  site in Peachtree Corners was put under contract in the fall of 1995.

In the winter of 1996, the board hired Zach Young, former Vice President and Assistant Headmaster at The Westminster Schools, to replace the retiring Adler. Under its new name, Wesleyan opened the 1996–97 school year with 556 students on its new campus. That year, the facilities consisted of 15 modular units, a soccer field, and the school's first permanent structure, Marchman Gymnasium.

In August 1997, Wesleyan added the high school building, Cleghorn Hall, which was named after the Wesleyan principal Gwen Michael Cleghorn. Under her leadership, Wesleyan secured accreditation from the Southern Association of Colleges and Schools. In the 1997–1998 school year, Wesleyan’s first senior class of 17 students graduated.

In 1998, Wesleyan added the Hoover Student Activities Center, Henderson Stadium, and Robinson Field, and its enrollment increased to more than 860 students. Modular units for a high school and middle school cafeteria were added, along with units for the music department. In the spring of 1999, the Curley Tennis Courts were dedicated, and a baseball field was added.

In the fall of 2000, the school purchased  of adjacent land. This new property adjoins the campus along Peachtree Parkway and is used for physical education, soccer, football, cross country, and lacrosse.

Construction of Wesley Hall, the largest facility on campus, was completed in the fall of 2001. The building contains classrooms, a theater, a dining hall, a library, a prayer chapel, science and computer labs, and office space.

The lower school building, Warren Hall, was completed during the summer of 2002. The building includes classrooms, a library, a gymnasium, and a combination dining hall/auditorium. In 2003, Davidson Natatorium opened.

Wesleyan School christened Gillfillan Hall administrative offices and announced the completion of the current Spalding Drive campus master plan at a ceremony on September 24, 2007. Gillfillan is adjacent to Marchman Gymnasium and houses the offices of the Headmaster, Development, Business, Communications and Admissions in its .

Academics
Wesleyan is a K–12 school. In the lower school, class sizes average 18, with two teachers in most classrooms. In the middle school and high school, class sizes average less than 15. Each student from grades 5–12 receiving a personal computer and follows a personalized plan. In the middle school, the students are divided by gender in math and English classes to accommodate for purported learning differences between boys and girls. 68% of teachers have advanced degrees.

The high school offers AP classes in Capstone Research, Capstone Seminar, Computer Science, English Language, English Literature, French Language and Culture, Spanish Language and Culture, Calculus AB, Calculus BC, Statistics, Biology, Chemistry, Environmental Science, Physics, European History, Macroeconomics, Microeconomics, United States Government and Politics, United States History, Music Theory, and Studio Art. In 2011 nearly 91% of students passed their AP exams. About 34% of the class of 2012 received recognition from the College Board as AP Scholars. In the past several years, many students have received recognition from the National Merit Scholarship Committee as National Merit Finalists, Semifinalists, and Commended Scholars, including three members of the class of 2012.

Students in recent years have been accepted to Yale University, Harvard University, Carnegie Mellon University, Cornell University, and Stanford University. According to U.S. News & World Report, 70% of students from the class of 2011 matriculated at colleges and universities ranked in the top 100 schools. The 25th percentile SAT score for the class of 2012 was 1680, while the 75th percentile score was 2000. On the SAT-Math, 25% of students scored above 690. The mid 50% ACT composite score range for the class of 2017 was 27–32.

Athletics
Wesleyan competes in the Georgia High School Association (GHSA) and fields teams at the varsity level in the following sports: baseball, boys basketball, girls basketball, boys cross country, girls cross country, fastpitch softball, football, boys golf, girls golf, boys lacrosse, girls lacrosse, boys soccer, girls soccer, boys swimming, girls swimming, boys tennis, girls tennis, boys track, girls track, volleyball and wrestling.

Wesleyan has won twelve overall Georgia Athletic Directors Association Director's Cups, eleven in Class A (2002, 2009, 2010, 2011, 2012, 2017, 2018, 2019, 2020, 2021, and 2022) and one in Class AA in 2008. The Director's Cup is awarded by the Georgia Athletic Directors Association at the end of each school year to one school from each of Georgia's seven classifications that has shown superior athletic performance for that school year. Points are awarded for performance in state athletic competitions. Wesleyan's female athletes have won fifteen Girls' Director's Cups while the male athletes have won eight Boys' Director's Cups.

Wesleyan has won a total of 69 state championships in 17 different sports. It won the first team state championship in school history in girls' tennis in 2001.

The girls' basketball program holds the record for most girls' basketball state championships in state history. Wesleyan has won state championships 2002, 2004, 2005, 2006, 2008, 2009, 2010, 2011, 2012, 2013, 2015, 2017 and 2018. The 2013 title was the program's sixth straight, which tied the state record held by Hart County High School, which won six straight from 1989 to 1994.

Wesleyan's volleyball team, under Coach Ted Russell, won state championships in 2004, 2005, 2006, 2007, 2009 and 2013.

The boys' cross-country team, under the leadership of Brian Kennerly (1998–2009) and Chad McDaniel (2010–present), won state championships in 2001, 2002, 2005, 2006, 2007, 2009, 2010, 2011, 2014, 2018, 2019, and 2020. The girls' cross-country team, under the leadership of Libby Houk (1999–2001), Dan Byrne (2002–2008) and Chad McDaniel (2011–present), won state championships in 2001, 2002, 2003, 2012, 2013, 2020, 2021, and 2022.

The wrestling team won a team State Dual Championship in 2007.

The boys' basketball team won its first state championship in 2008, and won again in 2010.

The baseball team won state championships in 2008, 2009, 2010, 2015, and 2022.

The football team won a state championship in 2008.

The boys' swim and dive team won its first state championship in 2011, and won again in 2012.

The boys' track & field team and the boys' soccer team won the school's first titles (AA) in those sports in the same week in 2016. The girls' soccer team won its first title in 2017.  Wesleyan would win the boys' soccer and girls' soccer state championship in 2019.  The Wesleyan boys' soccer team would repeat as champions in 2020.

The softball team won back to back state championships in 2017 and 2018.  The Wesleyan softball team would add another state championship in 2021 and in 2022.

The girls' track & field team won a state championship in 2018.

In 2022, the Wesleyan boys' tennis and girls' tennis teams swept, and both won a state championship.  

In 2008, Sports Illustrated named Wesleyan the top school in athletics in Georgia, and sixteenth in the nation.

State Championships
Baseball – (5) 2008, 2009, 2010, 2015, 2022 
Boys Basketball – (2) 2008, 2010 
Boys Cross Country – (12) 2001, 2002, 2005, 2006, 2007, 2009, 2010, 2011, 2014, 2018, 2019, 2020  
Boys Tennis – (2) 2011, 2022 
Boys Track - (1) 2016 
Boys Soccer - (4) 2016, 2019, 2021 
Boys Swimming – (2) 2011, 2012 
Fastpitch Softball – (4) 2017, 2018, 2021, 2022 
Football – (1) 2008 
Girls Basketball – (13) 2002, 2004, 2005, 2006, 2008, 2009, 2010, 2011, 2012, 2013, 2015, 2017, 2018 
Girls Cross Country – (8) 2001, 2002, 2003, 2012, 2013, 2020, 2021, 2022 
Girls Golf – (2) 2009, 2017 
Girls Soccer – (2) 2017, 2019 
Girls Tennis – (4) 2001, 2015, 2016, 2022 
Girls Track –  (2) 2009, 2018 
Volleyball – (6) 2004, 2005, 2006, 2007, 2009, 2013 
Wrestling – (1) 2007

Georgia Athletic Directors Association Director's Cup
Overall GADA Director's Cups Won (12) - Class A (2002, 2009, 2010, 2011, 2012, 2017, 2018, 2019, 2020, 2021, 2022), Class AA (2008)
Girls' Athletics GADA Director's Cups Won (15) - Class A (2002, 2009, 2010, 2011, 2012, 2017, 2018, 2019, 2022), Class AA (2003, 2005, 2006, 2008, 2015, 2016)
Boys' Athletics GADA Director's Cups Won (8) - Class A (2009, 2011, 2012, 2018, 2019, 2021, 2022), Class AA (2008)

Notable alumni

 David Andrews (Class of 2011), football center (gridiron football), University of Georgia, Super Bowl LI, and Super Bowl LIII Champion for the New England Patriots
 Anne Marie Armstrong (Class of 2009), basketball player, University of Georgia and Atlanta Dream
 Chad Hall (Class of 2004), football, US Air Force Academy and Philadelphia Eagles, 2012 NFC Champion San Francisco 49ers;
 Druw Jones (Class of 2022), baseball player, Arizona Diamondbacks
 Jahmai Jones (Class of 2015), baseball player, Los Angeles Angels
 Beth Moore (Class of 2000), attorney and politician, Georgia House of Representatives
 Howard Thompkins (Class of 2008), basketball player, University of Georgia and Los Angeles Clippers
Tommy Tremble (Class of 2018), football tight end, Notre Dame Fighting Irish, Carolina Panthers
Jake Humphrey (Class of 2001), professional wrestler known as Humphrey Jacobs the 1st. Ranked 495th in the 2018 edition of the annual Pro Wrestling Illustrated PWI500 and voted 2017 Colorado’s most hated wrestler. Also was a USA Rugby All American in 2006.
James Ramsey (baseball) (Class of 2008), baseball player, The St. Louis Cardinals selected him in the first round of the 2012 Major League Baseball draft.

References

External links

 Wesleyan School

Christian schools in Georgia (U.S. state)
Private elementary schools in Georgia (U.S. state)
Private middle schools in Georgia (U.S. state)
Private high schools in Georgia (U.S. state)
Schools in Gwinnett County, Georgia
Preparatory schools in Georgia (U.S. state)
Peachtree Corners, Georgia
1963 establishments in Georgia (U.S. state)
Educational institutions established in 1963